is a train station located on the Eizan Electric Railway (Eiden) Eizan Main Line in Yamabana-Itchodacho, Sakyō-ku, Kyoto, Kyoto Prefecture, Japan.

Layout
The station is located along Kitayama-dōri and the northern end of Higashiōji-dōri. The station has 2 side platforms on the ground along the tracks.  There is Shūgakuin Depot at the back of the building in the south-east of the station.

Surroundings
Shugakuin Imperial Villa
Manshu-in
Sekizan Zen-in
Plaza Shūgakuin
Saginomori Shrine
Myōen-ji (Matsugasaki Daikokuten)
Kirarazaka
Matsugasaki Bridge (over the Takano River)
Gozan no Okuribi (Myō/Hō)
7-Eleven Kyoto Shūgakuin Ekimae
Shūgakuin Depot

Adjacent stations

References

Railway stations in Japan opened in 1925
Railway stations in Kyoto Prefecture